Untenable is the second studio album by American power pop band Bad Moves. It was originally scheduled for release on May 29, 2020 under Don Giovanni Records but the release date was later delayed until June 26, 2020.

The first single from the album, "Party with the Kids Who Wanna Party with You" was released on April 7, 2020. The second single "End of Time" was released on May 5, 2020. The third single "Cape Henlopen" was released on May 28, 2020.

Background
The album was recorded in late-2019 at Headroom Studios in Philadelphia, Pennsylvania with Hop Along member Joe Reinhart.

Track listing

References

External links
 Bad Moves - Untenable at Don Giovanni Records

2020 albums
Don Giovanni Records albums